Lukáš Bundil (* 18 July 1986 Aš) is a Czech musician playing guitar in the group Slza. Together with Petr Lexa they created a jingle for the television series Přístav.

Life 
He was born in 1986 in Aš, he moved to Prague after high school. He was a member of the Xindl X band. He has learned to play guitar since he was a little boy. He was taught by guitarist Zdeněk Fišer. He gives his experience with playing guitar, because today he is teaching guitar playing.

References 

1986 births
Living people
Slza members